Clyde Amateur Rowing Club is a rowing club on the River Clyde, based at the West Boathouse, Glasgow Green, Glasgow, Scotland. The club is affiliated to Scottish Rowing.

History
The club was founded in 1865 and is on the west side of a shared boathouse with the Clydesdale Amateur Rowing Club. The Penny Brothers (Thomas, Laurence, Alexander, William and James Penny) were all members of Clyde ARC during the 1920s and 1930s.

Notable Members 
Former alumni include:

 Polly Swann
 Imogen Walsh

Honours

British champions

References

Sports teams in Glasgow
Rowing clubs in Scotland
Sports clubs established in 1865
1865 establishments in Scotland
Glasgow Green
Rowing clubs of the River Clyde